John Kevin Northcote (27 July 1938 – 19 December 2008) was an Australian rules footballer. He played 14 games for Hawthorn in the VFL between 1956 and 1959 and kicked six goals. His debut match was the 1956 Round 12 clash with Collingwood at Victoria Park.

He then moved to country leagues and played with Rupanyup in Victoria from 1960 to 1961, West Gambier Football Club in South Australia in 1962, and Moe Football Club in 1963.

Northcote later moved to Tasmania and played with Launceston in the NTFA during the 1965 season.

References

Holmesby, Russell and Main, Jim (2011). The Encyclopedia of AFL Footballers. 9th ed. Melbourne: Bas Publishing.

1938 births
2008 deaths
Hawthorn Football Club players
Launceston Football Club players
Australian rules footballers from Victoria (Australia)